Coxey's Army was a protest march by unemployed workers from the United States, led by Ohio businessman Jacob Coxey. They marched on Washington, D.C. in 1894, the second year of a four-year economic depression that was the worst in United States history at the time. Officially named the Army of the Commonwealth in Christ, its nickname came from its leader and was more enduring. It was the first significant popular protest march on Washington, and the expression "Enough food to feed Coxey's Army" originates from this march.

First march
The purpose of the march, termed a "petition in boots", was to protest the unemployment caused by the Panic of 1893 and to lobby for the government to create jobs which would involve building roads and other public works improvements, with workers paid in paper currency which would expand the currency in circulation, consistent with populist ideology. The march originated with 100 men in Massillon, Ohio, on March 25, 1894, passing through Pittsburgh, Becks Run and Homestead, Pennsylvania, in April.
 

The Army's western section received the nickname Kelley's Army, after California leader "General" Charles T. Kelley. Although larger at its beginning, Kelley's Army lost members on its long journey; few made it past the Ohio River.  Another group, Fry's Army, began marching in Los Angeles, but largely dissipated east of St. Louis.  Various groups from around the country gathered to join the march, and its number had grown to 500 with more on the way from further west when it reached Washington on April 30, 1894. The  Shreve farm site at current day Colmar Manor, Maryland, was used by the 6,000 jobless men as a camp site. Coxey and other leaders of the movement were arrested the next day for walking on the grass of the United States Capitol. Interest in the march and protest rapidly dwindled. Although it was ultimately unsuccessful, the march is notable as the first protest march on Washington, D.C.

Some of the most militant Coxeyites were those who formed their own "armies" in Pacific Northwest centers such as Butte, Tacoma, Spokane, and Portland. Many of these protesters were unemployed railroad workers who blamed railroad companies, President Grover Cleveland's monetary policies, and excessive freight rates for their plight. The climax of this movement was perhaps on April 21, 1894, when William Hogan and approximately 500 followers commandeered a Northern Pacific Railway train for their trek to Washington, D.C. They enjoyed support along the way, which enabled them to fight off the federal marshals attempting to stop them. Federal troops finally apprehended the Hoganites near Forsyth, Montana. While the protesters never made it to the capital, the military intervention they provoked proved to be a rehearsal for the federal force that broke the Pullman Strike later that year.

Second march

Coxey organized a second march in 1914. A portion of the march reached Monessen, Pennsylvania, on April 30. Another contingent from New York City merged with the march.
When the march reached Washington D.C., Coxey addressed a crowd of supporters from the steps of the United States Capitol.

Legacy
Although Coxey's proposal for government jobs was radical for its time, it came to be part of U.S. federal policy with the passing of the New Deal. On May 1, 1944, Coxey was asked to read his original petition from the steps of the Capitol. More significantly, marches on Washington became a popular way for people to express their displeasure at the government or various of its policies.

Coxey's Army in culture

Among the people observing the march was L. Frank Baum, before he gained fame.  There are political interpretations of his book, the Wonderful Wizard of Oz, which have often been related to Coxey's Army. In the novel, Dorothy, the Scarecrow (the American farmer), Tin Woodman (the industrial worker), and Cowardly Lion (William Jennings Bryan), march on the yellow brick road to the Emerald City, the Capital (or Washington, D.C.), demanding relief from the Wizard, who is interpreted to be the President. Dorothy's shoes (made of silver in the book, not the familiar ruby that is depicted in the movie) are interpreted to symbolize using free silver instead of the gold standard (the road of yellow brick) because the shortage of gold precipitated the Panic of 1893.  In the film adaptation of The Wizard of Oz, the silver shoes were turned into ruby for the cinematic effect of color, as Technicolor was still in its early years when the movie was produced.  However, this theory was not advanced until many decades after the book was written.

The phrase Coxey's Army has also come to refer to a ragtag band, possibly due to an incident during the second march in 1914.

Coxey's Army also plays a prominent role in Garet Garrett's The Driver, in which the main character is a journalist following the march.

In his story "Two Thousand Stiffs" (published in hardcover as part of the 1907 collection The Road), Jack London describes his experiences as a member of Kelley's Army.  The story gives a vivid account on a personal level of the motivations of the unemployed "stiffs", the military style organization of their army, and the more and less willing support given them by more fortunate Americans who were still sympathetic to their cause.  In London's description, he joined Kelley's Army at Council Bluffs, Iowa, and remained with it until its dissolution at the Mississippi River, a dissolution caused primarily by the inability to capture trains for transportation from an alerted railroad industry.

In the 1955 play Inherit the Wind, Meeker (the jailer/bailiff) mentions Coxey's Army when talking to Rachel Brown in an early scene.

Coxey's Army's arrival in Washington D.C. sets the backdrop of the 2016 historical murder mystery, A March To Remember, by Anna Loan-Wilsey.

The expression "Enough food to feed Coxey's Army" signifies that the person commenting believes there is a great deal more food being prepared or presented than is actually required for the persons to be fed.

In the prologue to "On the Way Home," the diary of Laura Ingalls Wilder of her family's trip from De Smet, South Dakota, to Mansfield, Missouri in 1894, there is mention of Coxey's armies.  The prologue (and epilogue) to "On the Way Home" were written by Wilder's daughter Rose Wilder Lane, who was an accomplished and well-known writer long before her mother.  Lane describes Coxey's armies as coming from California, seizing railroad trains as they headed East towards Washington, and terrorizing towns and pillaging for food on their route.  Lane concluded, "In all the cities Federal troops were guarding the Government's buildings."

See also
Bonus Army
Carl Browne
List of protest marches on Washington, D.C.
Fry's Army
James Renshaw Cox for a later march on Washington

Footnotes

Further reading
Benjamin F. Alexander, Coxey's Army: Popular Protest in the Gilded Age, Baltimore, MD: Johns Hopkins University Press, 2015
Franklin Folsom, Impatient Armies of the Poor: The Story of Collective Action of the Unemployed, 1808–1942. Niwot, CO: University Press of Colorado, 1991.
Donald L. McMurry, Coxey's Army: A Study of the Industrial Army Movement of 1894. [1929] Seattle, WA: University of Washington Press, 1968.
Jerry Prout, Coxey’s Crusade for Jobs: Unemployment in the Gilded Age (Northern Illinois University Press, 2016). 152 pp.
Carlos A. Schwantes, Coxey's Army: An American Odyssey. Lincoln: University of Nebraska Press, 1985.
Henry Vincent, The Story of the Commonweal: Complete and Graphic Narrative of the Origin and Growth of the Movement: Similar Movements in History — The March — Portraits of the Leaders — Other Pictures — The Objects Sought. Chicago: W.B. Conkey Co., 1894.

External links

Daily Bleed Calendar: March 25, 1894
"Recollections of a contingent of Coxey's Army passing through Straughn, Indiana, in April of 1894," poem by Jared Carter.
"Coxey's Army" tribute song to Jacob Coxey and his march for jobs and justice, written by Joe DeFilippo and performed by the R.J. Phillips Band

1894 in Washington, D.C.
1894 labor disputes and strikes
History of Washington, D.C.
Protest marches in Washington, D.C.
Marching